Unnaipol Oruvan may refer to:
 Unnaipol Oruvan (1965 film), directed by Jayakanthan
 Unnaipol Oruvan (2009 film), directed by Chakri Toleti
Unnaipol Oruvan, a novel by Jayakanthan